The Discovery Science Place is a children's science museum located in Tyler, in the U.S. state of Texas. The museum is housed in an old car dealership and has been in service to the community since 1993. The museum offers an extensive array of exhibits including:
A small mock television news station with working cameras and mini-control board
Assorted physics-related exhibits, including a kinetic sculpture.
Fish tank with assorted goldfish
A large (indoor) man-made cave, with various rock/sediment exhibits built-in and an earthquake simulator.
Indoor dinosaur fossil dig pit
A scale representation of various public buildings located in and around Tyler, including the Smith county courthouse, Brookshire's Grocery Company, and Southside Bank.

References

External links
Discovery Science Place official website

Children's museums in Texas
Science museums in Texas
Museums in Tyler, Texas